Miguel Gomes may refer to:

Miguel Gomes (director) (born 1972), Portuguese film director
Miguel Gomes (fencer) (born 1972), Portuguese fencing instructor
Nuno Miguel Gomes (born 1978), Portuguese football defender

See also 
 Miguel Gómez (disambiguation)